Thomas Gallo (born 30 April 1999) is an Argentine rugby union player, currently playing for Pro14 side Benetton. His preferred position (first line) prop. He was Italian qualified.

Benetton
Gallo signed his first professional contract for Benetton in September 2020. He made his Benetton debut in Round 6 of the 2020–21 Pro14 against Cardiff Blues.

International career
In 2019 Gallo was named in the Argentina Under 20 squad. 
In September 2021 Gallo was named in Argentina squad for 2021 Rugby Championship. He made his debut in Round 6 of the 2021 Rugby Championship against Australia.

Gallo was eligible to play for Italy due to his grandfather's Italian ancestry, before winning his first cap for Argentina in 2021.

References

External links

1999 births
Living people
Argentine rugby union players
Benetton Rugby players
Rugby union props
Sportspeople from San Miguel de Tucumán
Yacare XV players
Argentina international rugby union players